Holcoponera can refer to:
Holcoponera Cameron, 1891, junior synonym of Cylindromyrmex
Holcoponera Mayr, 1887, junior synonym of Gnamptogenys